Pincong is a Chinese Internet forum focusing on political topics, literally meaning "tasting of onion". Users of this forum are called "Pincongers". Its server is located in United States, and it is currently blocked by Great Firewall in Mainland China. The website enables users to make discussions about political issues, while they are usually banned in Zhihu, a popular Chinese Q&A forum. The older site of Pincong was shut down on October 30, 2018, and current site (New Pincong) re-opens in November 2018.

Features 
The website's interface is written in Simplified Chinese, and a majority of its users are from China, but there are also users from Hong Kong, Taiwan and other countries/regions. Since Pincong is blocked in Mainland China, people from the mainland need VPN to access this website, users also share technical experiences regarding internet censorship circumvention(such as China Great Firewall,China's spyware)

To protect users' safety, the server neither record their IP address nor need email address or phone number for registration. It also has function like delayed posting.The default search engine throughout the website is DuckDuckGo. Many users believe it is safer to access Pincong via iOS than Android. and many of them suggest it's better for you to use a browser can enable 'private window with Tor.'(You can try Brave in computer)

Most of the discussions in Pincong are related to politics.

Other features of Pincong include open source website architecture, transparent background data, and disabled private messaging preset.

Administrator system 

Pincong users can be promoted to administrators by votes from experienced users, rather than being appointed by the site owner. That was done through the so-called "reputation system", where likes and dislikes from users with high reputations towards posts will affect that of the poster. Users with enough reputation are granted foreground admin permissions such as banning users who violated site rules, collapsing or unfolding posts. Users with certain amount of reputation can also make proposals on site rules, however only administrators can vote on the bills.

Contents and influences 

 August 7, 2019, during Hong Kong protests against China extradition, a Hong Kong protester posted an article in Pincong titled A letter for Mainland fellows from Hong Kong protesters。
 November 13, 2019, many users from Mainland China uploaded their student card, diploma or photo IDs, partially covered by a piece of paper to anonymously support Hong Kong protests. Some wrote "Freedom will not perish, but the CCP will demise."。
 November 30, 2019, a Pincong user published a webpage in GitHub named Geng Shuang Emulator, to emulate clichéd speech of Chinese diplomat Geng Shuang. It randomly rearranges Geng Shuang's speeches, with keywords replaced to generate a new speech. That attracted some attention of political activists from Hong Kong and Taiwan. The emulator was removed on December 30.
 January 12, 2020, another Pincong user published Hua Chunying Emulator.
 April 16, 2020, Nature journal in its article China is tightening its grip on coronavirus research, cited an article from Pincong, How to view China required all academic papers about COVID-19 to be filed (Chinese:《如何看待國內規定與新冠肺炎有關的學術論文需審核備案》).

Reviews 

 The Washington Post described Pincong as a popular forum among Chinese Geeks, and mentioned its style is similar to Reddit.
 An article in Quartz Financial says majority of Pincong users are liberals in China.
 Global Times, a media owned and controlled by Chinese government, rated Pincong as Anti-China forum.

See also 

 LIHKG
 HK Golden
 PTT Bulletin Board System
 Internet censorship circumvention
 Utopia (internet forum)

References

External links 
 New Pincong Forum
 Mohu Forum （A Chinese political parody website, which previously used the same parent domain as Pincong. The site management is independent however.）
 Github: Pincong-WeCenter（The forum platform adapted by Pincong）
 Github: New Pincong database inquiry

Question-and-answer websites
Chinese Internet forums
Anonymous social media
Internet properties established in 2017
Internet properties established in 2018